Galway Business School is a private business school in Galway, Ireland. Opened in 2000, the college initially provided further education business courses, and now provides QQI-validated degree courses.
Galway Business School (GBS) was set up by the Galway Cultural Institute (GCI) which provides English language courses. From 2003, GBS provided courses validated by the Business and Technology Education Council (BTEC/EDEXCEL) and the Institute of Commercial Management (ICM). GBS also provides ACCA preparatory courses and ECDL programmes.

As of 2005, the college was delivering a one-year BA in Business Management degree programme, validated by the University of Wales.
In 2006, GBS became a recognised FETAC course provider. In 2014, the GBS business degree programme gained QQI accreditation.

References

External links
 

Business schools in the Republic of Ireland
Universities and colleges in the Republic of Ireland